The 1951 LPGA Tour was the second season since the LPGA Tour officially began in 1950. The season ran from January 5 to October 19. The season consisted of 19 official money events. Babe Zaharias won the most tournaments, nine. She also led the money list with earnings of $15,087.

There were two first-time winners in 1951, Pat O'Sullivan, an amateur, and Betsy Rawls, who won 55 LPGA events in her career.

The tournament results are listed below.

Tournament results
The following table shows all the official money events for the 1951 season. "Date" is the ending date of the tournament. The numbers in parentheses after the winners' names are the number of wins they had on the tour up to and including that event. Majors are shown in bold.

(a) - amateur
* - non-member at time of win

References

External links
LPGA Tour official site

LPGA Tour seasons
LPGA Tour